The Angola basketball cup is the second most important nationwide annual basketball competition in Angola. The final stage of the 2015 edition for men (quarterfinals) ran from March 10 to April 10, 2015 and was contested by eight teams in a two-leg knock out competition system, followed by a two-leg semifinal. The final was played in a single match. Recreativo do Libolo was the winner by beating Primeiro de Agosto 79-70 in the final.

2015 Angola Men's Basketball Cup

Final round

2015 Angola Women's Basketball Cup

See also
 2015 Angola Basketball Super Cup
 2015 BIC Basket
 2015 Victorino Cunha Cup

References

Angola Basketball Cup seasons
Cup
March 2015 sports events in Africa
April 2015 sports events in Africa